Roger Fisher may refer to:

Roger Fisher (academic) (1922–2012), American professor of law at Harvard
Roger Fisher (organist), British organist and pianist
Roger Fisher (guitarist) (born 1950), American guitarist with Heart